

Men's events

Women's events

Open events

Medal table

References

 

Events at the 1999 Pan American Games
Sailing at the Pan American Games
1999 in sailing
Sailing competitions in Canada